→

Christopher Hamill (born 19 December 1958), known professionally as Limahl (an anagram of Hamill), is an English pop singer. He was the lead singer of the pop group Kajagoogoo beginning in 1981, before embarking on a brief solo career, garnering the 1984 hit "The NeverEnding Story", the theme song for the film of the same name.

Early life
Christopher Hamill was born on 19 December 1958 at Pemberton, Wigan, Lancashire, in North West England, to Eric and Cynthia Hamill. He has one sister and two brothers. The four children were all born by the time their mother was 22. Hamill attended Mesnes High School, Wigan, Greater Manchester before eventually enrolling at the Westcliff-on-Sea Palace Theatre Repertory Company.

Career
With aspirations to be an actor, Chris Hamill toured with the company in a production of Joseph and the Amazing Technicolor Dreamcoat. In 1980, he was given a small role in an episode of the ITV police series The Gentle Touch. In 1981, he also appeared as an extra in the promotional video for Adam and the Ants' number one UK single "Stand and Deliver".

He had a keen interest in music, forming a short-lived punk band called Vox Deus. Next he joined and left a band called Crossword. Later he answered an advert in the music press to join a band to be called Brooks with Mike Nolan. Chris Hamill adopted his stage name Limahl (an anagram of his surname) at the time he was recruited by the existing members of Kajagoogoo, who were then performing under the name Art Nouveau.

The four members of Art Nouveau, the band who were yet to become Kajagoogoo, had placed an advertisement in the music magazine Melody Maker, asking for a 'front man who could sing and look good'. Hamill attended the audition and subsequently joined the band which was then, after some deliberation, renamed Kajagoogoo. Soon after he had joined, Limahl met Nick Rhodes, keyboardist of the group Duran Duran, while Limahl was working as a waiter at the Embassy Club in London. Rhodes agreed to co-produce the band's first single, "Too Shy".

Limahl later said: "I met Nick Rhodes and it changed my life." Kajagoogoo signed a deal with EMI, due in part to Rhodes' involvement with the band, and the single "Too Shy" was released in January 1983. It went to number 1 in the UK Singles Chart and made the top 5 on the US Billboard Hot 100.

The group had further hits with "Ooh to Be Ah" (UK No. 7) and "Hang on Now" (UK No. 13), with their debut album White Feathers reaching UK No. 5. Their first major UK tour was attended by 60,000 people, and the final show at the Hammersmith Odeon in London was recorded and released on home video/Laserdisc (the 16-track White Feathers Tour).

In mid-1983, soon after the end of the White Feathers concert tour, the four other members of the band agreed that Limahl should be fired. As recounted years later by Nick Beggs and other Kajagoogoo members on the VH-1 program Bands Reunited, the actual firing of Limahl was done by their manager, and the band learned that it had been done over the telephone. Limahl was quoted in the press as saying: "I've been betrayed!", and "I was sacked for making them a success".

Limahl later said: "I was in utter disbelief but the overwhelming emotion was anger, mainly towards the manager at first, but later, as I mulled over the 'betrayal', I was especially angry at my four professional colleagues, who I had viewed not only as friends but almost as family." The band stated Limahl had become difficult to work with as they didn't share his vision for the band's future. Soon after Limahl's departure, bassist Nick Beggs commented: "It was a business decision and not one we took lightly. He wanted the band to go in a different direction to the rest of us. Eventually, we realised we were on a different planet to Limahl." Beggs also stated the band harboured no ill-will towards Limahl, and blamed the press for sensationalising the matter. Guitarist Steve Askew commented: "At first...we did everything possible to make Limahl feel like part of the furniture, but, you know, his lifestyle is so different from ours. We're very normal people whereas Limahl likes the bright lights."

Solo career
After leaving the band, Limahl launched a solo career, achieving hits with "Only for Love" (UK No. 16) in 1983, and with "The NeverEnding Story" (UK No. 4) in 1984. The latter was the title theme from the film of the same name, composed by Giorgio Moroder. The English version was sung with Beth Anderson. The French language version "L'Histoire Sans Fin" was performed with Ann Calvert, with translated lyrics by Pierre-André Dousset. The single reached the Top 5 in several countries and was number one in Spain, Sweden, and Norway.

His debut album, 1984's Don't Suppose, was a commercial failure in the UK, peaking at No. 63. It was better received in continental Europe with it topping the Norwegian album chart and reaching the Top 10 in Austria, Sweden and Switzerland.

Following this, Limahl released two more albums: 1986's Colour All My Days and Love Is Blind in 1992, both of which failed to chart in the UK but found moderate success in Italy, Spain, and Germany.

Limahl, with the hairstyle he sported circa 1984, was illustrator Arthur Adams' inspiration for the look of the Marvel Comics X-Men character Longshot.

2003–present
In late 2003, Limahl briefly reunited with the other members of Kajagoogoo for the VH1 special Bands Reunited (which aired in 2004), but this did not lead to a permanent reunion. Also in 2004, Limahl took part in the musical reality show Comeback on German TV channel Pro7. A year later, in 2005, he appeared in a similar UK show, Hit Me Baby One More Time on ITV. The episode in which Limahl appeared also featured Howard Jones, who had enlisted the services of Kajagoogoo bass player Nick Beggs to support him during his own performance.

Limahl eventually reunited with Kajagoogoo again in 2008. Now reformed in their original five-piece line-up, the band took part in various music festivals in Europe.

In 2011, the band released a new track, "Death-Defying Headlines", as a digital single. Limahl as a solo artist released a new single in 2012 called "1983", co-written/produced with Norwegians Tommy Olsen, Rune Maurtvedt, and Stig Antonsen. The track was released worldwide by Dig Music (Norway) on 10 January 2012.

In November 2012, Limahl appeared on ITV's I'm a Celebrity...Get Me Out of Here! He came in as a late-entrant contestant alongside Rosemary Shrager.

Limahl continues to perform mostly 1980s retro based shows, often performing as part of multi-act tours. In 2016, Limahl appeared as part of the Billboard Tour playing to audiences in Osaka and Tokyo, Japan. He featured as part of the successful Totally 80s Tour of Australia in July 2016, playing to audiences in Melbourne, Sydney, and Adelaide. In July and August 2018, he played his first shows in America as part of the Retro Futura Tour.

In July 2019, "The NeverEnding Story" song recorded a sudden 2,063% increase in on-demand streams from 88,000 in the week ending 4 July to 1.91 million in the week ending 11 July after actors Gaten Matarazzo and Gabriella Pizzolo performed an a cappella duet of the track in the final episode of season three of Netflix series Stranger Things. In November 2019, Limahl and Kajagoogoo were featured in two episodes of season 9 of American Horror Story. On 5 June 2020, Limahl released the single 'Still in Love', which was his first single released since 2012, which was followed by 'One Wish For Christmas' in November. On 28 November 2020, he appeared as a guest on a late-night Channel 5 entertainment show called Jane McDonald Sings the Movies.

Personal life
Hamill is openly gay, but remains private as regards details concerning his personal life.

Discography

Solo albums

with Kajagoogoo
 White Feathers (1983)

Solo singles

Featured in

References

External links
 Official Limahl store
 KajaFax - The Officially Approved Limahl & Kajagoogoo Community & Fan Club
 Unofficial Limahl & Kajagoogoo YouTube video archives

English pop singers
British dance musicians
British synth-pop new wave musicians
English Buddhists
English male singers
English new wave musicians
LGBT Buddhists
Male new wave singers
Music in the Metropolitan Borough of Wigan
Singers from Manchester
People from Pemberton, Greater Manchester
1958 births
Living people
English gay musicians
20th-century English singers
21st-century English singers
20th-century British male singers
21st-century British male singers
I'm a Celebrity...Get Me Out of Here! (British TV series) participants
British LGBT singers
20th-century English LGBT people
21st-century British LGBT people
English tenors